Roland Sierens (born 15 July 1925) was a Belgian water polo player. He competed in the men's tournament at the 1952 Summer Olympics.

References

External links
 

1925 births
Possibly living people
Belgian male water polo players
Olympic water polo players of Belgium
Water polo players at the 1952 Summer Olympics
Sportspeople from Ghent
20th-century Belgian people